Army General Nikolai Yegorovich Makarov (born 7 October 1949) served as Chief of the General Staff of the Armed Forces of Russia and First Deputy Minister of Defence from 2007 to 2012, when he was replaced by Valery Gerasimov.

Early life and education
Makarov was born on 7 October 1949 in Glebovo, Ryazan Oblast. He graduated from the Higher Moscow Combined Arms Command School.

Career

Makarov assumed command over a platoon (later, company and battalion) with the Group of Soviet Forces in Germany. In 1979, he earned a degree at Frunze Military Academy and reported to the then Transbaikal Military District as deputy regiment commander, deputy division commander, motorized rifle division commander. In 1993, Makarov graduated from the General Staff Academy and was appointed as chief of staff, Russian Joint Force Tajikistan, and later was assigned to Volga Military District as the chief of staff for an independent army. In January 1998, he took up the post as ground (11th Guards Army) and coastal force commander at the Baltic Fleet. In September 1999, Nikolay Makarov assumed the duties as first deputy commander, Moscow Military District. On 25 December 2002, General Makarov was appointed as Commander Siberian Military District, one of the largest task force location areas spanning across a total of 30% of the country's territory, 16 constituent entities of the Russian Federation populated with over 20 million people.

On 8 May 2005, President of the Russian Federation Vladimir Putin promoted Nikolay Makarov to his present rank of General of the Army. In April 2007 he was appointed as Chief of Armament for the Russian Armed Forces/Deputy Minister of Defence. In June 2008, Nikolay Makarov was delegated the powers and responsibilities of Chief of the General Staff, First Deputy Minister of Defence. Two months later, when the Russo-Georgian War broke out, Makarov oversaw the deployment of Russian troops into Georgia for a five-day period after President Medvedev held a conversation with Defence Minister Anatoliy Serdyukov authorising the use of force. Makarov was a member of the Historical Truth Commission that existed between 2009 and 2012.

On 9 November 2012, Makarov was sacked from his position of Chief of the General Staff of the Armed Forces of the Russian Federation by Russian president Vladimir Putin. However, he was appointed as an aide to the Defense Minister Sergei Shoygu as an Analyst under the Office of Inspectors General on 4 March 2013 and reportedly received the Hero of Russian Federation in March 2012.

Family
He has family all around the world mostly in Canada and Russia. This includes his wife Anita Yegorovich (died in 2003) and his daughter Tatiana. He also had an adopted son named Andrei Popov who disappeared in 2004.

References

See also 
 New Look military reforms

1949 births
Living people
Frunze Military Academy alumni
Military Academy of the General Staff of the Armed Forces of Russia alumni
People from Rybnovsky District
Generals of the army (Russia)
Recipients of the Order of St. George
Recipients of the Order of Military Merit (Russia)
Soviet Army officers
Heroes of the Russian Federation
Deputy Defence Ministers of Russia